Joseph G. Brand is a biologist currently at Monell Chemical Senses Center. In 1985, Brand discovered that the substance amiloride is an inhibitor of sodium when present in the epithelia of rats.  Subsequently in 2005, Brand and Xia Li discovered that cats did not have a functioning sweet taste receptor, because it was made obsolete by evolution.

See also
Amiloride

References

Living people
Year of birth missing (living people)